The Greek term hesychia is a concept that can be translated as "stillness, rest, quiet, silence".

In Christianity

In hesychasm, an Eastern Orthodox Christian mystical tradition, it refers to the state of stillness and peace that is obtained through contemplation. Hesychia is a central theme discussed in most hesychast literature works.

Chapter 2 of the Systematic Sayings of the Desert Fathers is dedicated to the topic of hesychia.

In Neoplatonism

The term is also used in Neoplatonic texts such as the Enneads.

See also

Monastic silence
Apatheia
Inner peace
Tranquility
Centering prayer
Quietism (Christian philosophy)
Christianity and Hellenistic philosophy
Neoplatonism and Christianity
Mauna (silence) in Hinduism

References

Hesychasm
Christian contemplation
Christian mysticism
Christian prayer
Christian terminology
Silence
Meditation
Neoplatonism